Sofu Mehmed Pasha (died 1626) was an Ottoman administrator. Born and raised in Razgrad (today in Bulgaria), Mehmed Pasha served as the Ottoman governor of Egypt Eyalet (1611 – February 1615), Rumelia Eyalet (1617), Sivas Eyalet (1617–19), and Budin Eyalet (1624–26).

Apart from his governorships, Mehmed Pasha was appointed as a vizier in 1611 and served as the kaymakam to the Grand Vizier (sadâret kaymakamı) from sometime in the 1610s until late 1617, when he was appointed as third vizier. He was reappointed as sadâret kaymakamı in 1619, serving until his appointment as governor of Budin in 1624. He died in 1626.

See also
 List of Ottoman governors of Egypt

References

16th-century people from the Ottoman Empire
17th-century Ottoman governors of Egypt
Ottoman governors of Egypt
1626 deaths
Pashas
People from Razgrad
Year of birth unknown